Qays ibn Sa'd was a prominent leader of the Muslim army who was known for his use of defensive tactics in battles. He was one of the companions of the Islamic prophet Muhammad as well as Ali ibn Abi Talib.

Birth and early life
Qays ibn Sa'd was born in Medina around the time of Muhammad. His father was Sa'd ibn Ubadah, the leader of the Khazraj tribe.

Khalid Muhammad Khalid, a Egyptian religious scholar, remarks that Qays ibn Sa'd was said to be very cunning before his conversion to Islam. Khalid states that he would use his cunning to short-change the people of Medina and its surroundings.

Conversion to Islam 
After Sa'd converted to Islam, he introduced Qays to Muhammad. Sa'd tells Muhammad,
"This is your servant from now on."
Muhammad was pleased with Qays and told him,
"This place will always be yours for the rest of your life."
Khalid remarks that when Qays embraced Islam, he completely changed his life, attitude, vision, and disposition. Khalid states that through Islam, Qays learned how to treat people with sincerity and not to resort to deceit. He goes on to note that Qays abandoned all his cunning in dealing with people and devoted himself to becoming a true and sincere Muslim. He continues to say that there were still moments in his life where Qays was tempted to continue deceiving people. But, Qays' devotion to Islam helped him overpower the temptations. Qays himself stated, 
"If it were not for Islam I would have used my craftiness to outwit all the Arabs."
"If I did not hear the Prophet say craftiness and deceit reside in hell, I would have been the craftiest man of the nation."

Qays title
Qays was given the title al-Ansari, which means the helper or the supporter in Arabic.

Qays's characteristics
Khalid writes that Qays' family was known for their generosity. Khalid remarks that Muhammad praised them by stating, 
"Generosity is the dominant trait of this family."
Khalid notes that Qays would inherit his family's generosity and that his generosity surpassed his cleverness. Furthermore, Khalid states that Qays was also known for his charity. Khalid documents that Abu Bakr and Umar once stated,
"If we let this lad give free rein to his generosity, he would exhaust his father’s wealth." When his father, Sa'd ibn Ubadah heard their comments he replied "Abu Quhaafah and Ibn al-Khattab should not have tried to encourage my son to become a miser."
Khalid remarks that, to demonstrate Qays' generosity, Qays lent a person in debt a large sum of money. When it came time for the debtor to repay, Qays refused to take the money back and stated, 
"I never take back anything that I have given."
Khalid notes that Qays had characteristics of a leader except for a traditional Arab beard, saying the Ansar use to tease Qays by saying,
"If only we could buy him a beard."

Governor of Egypt
Imam Ali had selected Qays ibn Sa'd to become the governor of Egypt. In his book, The Succession to Muḥammad: A Study of The Early Caliphate, Wilferd Madelung discusses the appointment of Qays ibn Sa'd as the governor of Egypt by stating, 
"It was an act of reparation towards the Ansar and must have been seen by the Quraish opposition in Mecca as confirmation of their fear that Ali intended to abolish their privileged status as the ruling class in Islam."
Imam Ali chose Qays over Muhammad ibn Abu Hudhaifa, whom the Egyptian rebels looked as their leader and had control of al-Fustat. Madelung states,
"He (Imam Ali) did not feel indebted to the Egyptian rebels, who had returned home, as he did to al-Ashtar and the Kufans, and wished to keep at a distance from them."
He also rejected Amr ibn As, a supporter of Mu'awiyah, as a candidate even though Aisha demanded his restoration on the grounds of his popularity among the army of Egypt.  Madelung also states,
"Amr's leading role in the agitation against Uthman, based on motives of self-interest rather than Islamic principles, could hardly have appealed to Ali. Amr was a type of unscrupulous opportunist with whom Ali did not want to burden his reign."

According to Sahl ibn Sa'd al-Sa'idi of the Khazraj tribe, 
"Ali proposed to Qays ibn Sa'd that he choose a military guard in Median to accompany him, but Qays declined, stating that if he could enter Egypt only with a military escort he would rather never enter the country." 
Qays then left with only seven companions and was able to reach al-Fustat without any worries/troubles. He also brought a letter from Imam Ali informing the Egyptian Muslims of his (Qays's) appointment and read it in the mosque. The letter was written in Safar 36 AH (July 656 AD), roughly two months after Imam Ali's accession by Ubaydullah ibn Abi Rafi. Imam Ali mentioned that Muhammad had first been succeeded by two persons, after whom a ruler (Uthman) had taken charge and introduced innovations such that the community protested and reproached him. Madelung comments, 
"There was no mention of Uthman's violent death and of the part played by the Egyptian rebels. Ali evidently did not wish to touch the divisive matter."
After publicly addressing the letter, Qays then praised Imam Ali as the best man after Muhammad. He also received the bay'ahs (pledges of allegiance) for Imam Ali from the Egyptian people.

As the governor, Qays did not take any major steps against Uthman's partisans, who had seceded to the village of Kharbita near Alexandria after the revolt of Muhammad ibn Abi Hudhayfa. Uthman's partisans held out against Qays ibn Sa’d under their leader Yazid ibn al-Harith al-Maudliji of Kinana. They informed Qays that they wanted to see how matters developed. Furthermore, they stated that they would not interfere with his tax collectors and would not take up arms against him. Qays agreed to their request and did not try to force them to pledge allegiance (Uthman's partisans would later pledge allegiance to Mu'awiyah instead of Imam Ali). Maslama ibn Mukhallad al-Sa’idi, a kinsman of Qays, called for retaliation for the blood of Uthman. However, Qays assured Maslama that he did not wish to kill him under any circumstances. As a result, Maslama committed himself not to oppose Qays as long as Qays was the governor of Egypt. The agreement (with Uthman's partisans) allowed Qays to collect the tax throughout the land of Egypt.

Muhammad ibn Abi Hudhayfa and the Egyptian rebels were not mentioned in the accounts of Sahl ibn Sa’d.

According to al-Layth ibn Sa’d, an Egyptian, Muhammad ibn Hudhayfa left Egypt for Medina when Qays was appointed governor in order to join Imam Ali. When news reached Mu’awiyah that Muhammad departed from Egypt and was on transit to Medina, he demanded his subjects capture Muhammad and bring him to Sham (Damascus). After Muhammad was brought to Damascus, Mu’awiyah imprisoned him. Muhammad managed to escape prison but was killed by Yemenis on Dhul Hijja 36 AH (May 657 AD).

Military career

Shurta al-Khamis
Qays ibn Sa'd was the commander of Shurta al-Khamis, a military unit that supported Imam Ali and the Ahl al-Bayt in Iraq. Shurta al-Khamis was composed of forty thousand men who personally were loyal to Imam Ali.

Battle of Siffin
In the Battle of Siffin, Qays sided with Imam Ali against Mu'awiyah. He joined Sahl ibn Hunaif, one of the governors of Imam Ali, as he was setting off to join Imam Ali at the Battle of Siffeen. Qays was appointed as one of the commanders of Imam Ali's army. He commanded the foot soldiers of Basrah and was given a brigade of over 10,000 men. On the sixth day of the Battle of Siffeen, Qays ibn Sa'd al-Ansari came forward with the army to fight against ibn Dhi'l-Kala and his contingent. Severe fighting ensued. During the war, Qays concocted plots to defeat Mu'awiyah and his army. However, he realized that the plots were evil and dangerous, and reminded himself of Allah's holy words: 
"But the evil plot encompasses only him who makes it." (Sura Fatir 35:43) 
As a result, Qays discarded the plots and sought forgiveness from Allah.

After Imam Ali's martyrdom
Sulaym ibn Qays states: 
"Mu'awiyah came (to perform) the hajj during his Caliphate. That was after the killing of Imam Ali, and after the Peace Treaty with Imam Hasan. The Medinans (people of Medina) received him. Among them was Qays ibn Sa'd, who was the chief of the Ansar (helpers) and the son of their chief. So a talk took place between them (Qays ibn Sa'd and Mu'awiyah).

Death
Qays died in  59 AH (678-679 AD) in Medina.

See also
Imam Ali
Imam Hasan
Sa'd ibn Ubadah
List of Sahabah that did not give Bay'ah to Abu Bakr
Sulaym ibn Qays

References

Bibliography

670s deaths
Year of birth unknown
Companions of the Prophet
Rashidun governors of Egypt
People from Medina